Half knot may refer to the overhand knot, as it forms the first half of a reef knot, thief knot, granny knot, grief knot, or:

Half-Windsor knot
Half blood knot
Half hitch (Two half-hitches)